The 2018 Chinese Artistic Gymnastics Championships were held from 7 May to 13 May 2018 in Zhaoqing, Guangdong.

Women's Medalists

Men's Medalists

References

Chinese Artistic Gymnastics Championships
2018 in Chinese sport
Chinese Artistic Gymnastics Championships